William Goss Strickland (March 29, 1908 – January 26, 2000) was a Major League Baseball pitcher who played for the St. Louis Browns in .

External links

1908 births
2000 deaths
St. Louis Browns players
Major League Baseball pitchers
Baseball players from Georgia (U.S. state)